Rhododendron kesangiae is a rhododendron species endemic to Bhutan, where it grows at altitudes of  in the fir and hemlock forests. It is called Tala (ཏ་ལ) in Dzongkha. The flowers are rose pink, fading to purple.

Etymology
The species name kesangiae was given in honour to the Royal Grandmother, Ashi Kesang Choden (born 1930) Wangchuck of Bhutan.

Flowering
Rhododendron kesangiae flowers from April to May.

Lower taxa

References

 Notes Roy. Bot. Gard. Edinburgh 45: 331 1988 publ. 1989.
 "Rhododendron kesangiae: an endemic species from Bhutan with a description of a new variety", New Plantsman, Namgyel, P. Long, D.G. (Department of Forests, Thimphu, Bhutan), 1995. ISSN 1352-4186.
 Flora of Bhutan. Volume 2, part 1, Grierson A.J.C. & Long D.G., published by RBGE, 1991.

kesangiae
Flora of Bhutan
Endemic flora of Bhutan